The Streetsville Derbys were a Junior "A" ice hockey team from Streetsville, Ontario, Canada.  They were a part of the Ontario Junior Hockey League in 2011 until they merged into the Cobourg Cougars. As of 2018 the Streetsville Hockey League have revived the Derbys name for their “Select” and house league divisions.

History
The Derbys began in 1967 as part of the Suburban Jr. C league.  In 1970, they joined the new Mid-Ontario Jr. B league, and the following season the team joined the Central Jr. B league.  The team was briefly renamed the Mississauga Derbys for the 1992-93 season.  Streetsville claimed the Central Junior "B" Championship in 1976, 1977, 1978, 1979, 1980, 1983, 1984 and 1986, as well as the 1979 Sutherland Cup as All-Ontario Champions.  The Derbys were the hosts of the Royal Bank Cup 2006, the National Junior "A" Championship.  At the end of the 2007 season, it was announced that the Derbys would be moving to a new location, Westwood Arena in Rexdale, Ontario.  It is unknown if there will be an applicable name change.

In 1986, the Ontario Hockey Association, concerned with growing violence in hockey, suspended the Streetsville Derbys and the Brantford Classics from playing in the 1986-87 season.  The suspension of the Derbys had to do with a stick-swinging incident in the final game of the league quarter-final against the Nobleton Devils.  A Nobleton player was struck in the back of the head with a two-hand slash, which also struck a linesman and cut his eyelid.

The Streetsville Derbys were chosen by the Canadian Junior A Hockey League to host the 2006 Royal Bank Cup.  Instead of playing the games in a local arena, the Derbys' ownership elected to use the larger, neighbouring Powerade Centre in the rival town of Brampton, Ontario.  Despite the team playing well at the tournament, the execution of the tournament by team management was notoriously bad and criticized by Hockey Canada officials at the next AGM as well as the guest teams.  As they moved the event to the rival town of Brampton, most fans stayed home.  Streetsville finished first in the round robin (3-1), only to bow out with a 2-1 loss to the Yorkton Terriers of the Saskatchewan Junior Hockey League in the semi-final.

In March 2011, the Streetsville Derbys merged into the Cobourg Cougars and ceased to exist as members of the OJHL.

In the 2018 hockey season, the Streetsville Hockey League unveiled their newly revived divisional Derbys “Select” teams to compete in the Mississauga Hockey League.

Season-by-season results

Sutherland Cup appearances
1977: Stratford Cullitons defeated Streetsville Derbys 4-games-to-2
1978: Stratford Cullitons defeated Streetsville Derbys 9-points-to-5
1979: Streetsville Derbys defeated St. Catharines Falcons 4-games-to-none
1984: Waterloo Siskins defeated Streetsville Derbys 4-games-to-3
1986: Stratford Cullitons defeated Streetsville Derbys 4-games-to-none

Notable alumni
 Randy Exelby
 Moe Mantha
 Brandon Pirri

References

External links
Streetsville Derbys Webpage

Ontario Provincial Junior A Hockey League teams
Sport in Mississauga